German submarine U-503 was a Type IXC U-boat of Nazi Germany's Kriegsmarine during World War II. The submarine was laid down on 29 April 1940 at the Deutsche Werft yard in Hamburg as yard number 293, launched on 5 April 1941 and commissioned on 10 July 1941 under the command of Kapitänleutnant Otto Gericke.

The boat's service began with her being assigned to the 2nd U-boat Flotilla on her commissioning date for training and continuing with it for operations from 1 February 1942.

Design
German Type IXC submarines were slightly larger than the original Type IXBs. U-503 had a displacement of  when at the surface and  while submerged. She had two shafts and two  propellers.

U-503 was fitted with six  torpedo tubes (four fitted at the bow and two at the stern), 22 torpedoes, one  SK C/32 naval gun, 180 rounds, and a  SK C/30 as well as a  C/30 anti-aircraft gun. The boat had a complement of forty-eight.

Service history

U-503s first and only active war patrol began at Bergen in Norway on 28 February 1942, following two previous port to port sailings. The U-boat was sunk on 15 March by depth charges dropped by a PBO-1 Hudson of United States Navy squadron VP-82 south-east of Newfoundland, in position .

The aircraft, from Argentia, was escorting Convoy ON-72. The PBO-1s were twenty Hudson Mk.IIIA aircraft diverted from Lend-Lease to equip VP-82, and sank the first two U-boats by US forces;  on 1 March 1942 and U-503.

References

Bibliography

External links

German Type IX submarines
U-boats commissioned in 1941
U-boats sunk in 1942
U-boats sunk by US aircraft
U-boats sunk by depth charges
World War II submarines of Germany
World War II shipwrecks in the Atlantic Ocean
1941 ships
Ships built in Hamburg
Ships lost with all hands
Maritime incidents in March 1942